A list of notable films produced in Afghanistan.

The highest grossing Afghan film  is Osama (2003) with over $3,800,000 from a budget of only $46,000.

1930s–1970s

1980s

1990s–2010s

References

External links
 Afghan film at the Internet Movie Database